Robert Frind (born 2 December 1963) is a retired football defender from Austria. During his club career, Frind played for Austria Wien. He also made 5 appearances for the Austria national team.

External links

1963 births
Living people
Austrian footballers
Austria international footballers
Austria youth international footballers
Association football defenders
FK Austria Wien players